Byssomerulius psittacinus is a species of crust fungus in the family Irpicaceae. It was described as new to science in 2000 by mycologists Peter Buchanan, Leif Ryvarden, and Masana Izawa. The type was found in Fiordland National Park, where it was growing on the dead wood of Nothofagus. The specific epithet psittacinus ("parrot-like") refers to the wide range of colours observed in the fruit bodies. Initially a striking reddish-purple when fresh, it dries to brownish orange, pale orange yellow, or pale orange.

References

Fungi of New Zealand
Irpicaceae
Fungi described in 2000
Taxa named by Leif Ryvarden